David Churbuck is a blogger, technology journalist, and co-founder and former editor of Forbes.com.

Personal
He enjoys sculling and cycling.

Books
In 1988 he wrote "The Book of Rowing"- a book about the history of the sport.

Career
Churbuck has over 25 years of experience in print and online media. He is currently head of the Boston office of Sitrick and Company, a crisis management and strategic communications firm with headquarters in Los Angeles. Previously he was vice president of corporate marketing at Acquia. Prior to Acquia, he served as vice-president of Global Web Marketing at Lenovo.

Churbuck began his career in journalism as an intern for Cape Cod Times. He eventually worked his way up to becoming political editor and Massachusetts statehouse bureau chief for the Lawrence Eagle-Tribune. In 1988, he joined Forbes magazine as a senior editor. From 1994 to 2000, he directed Forbes' new media strategy. He later joined McKinsey & Company, where he was responsible for launching the firm's e-commerce online publication.

Awards and honors
Computer Press Association's Business Story of the Year
National Association of Science Writers' story of the year
Two first-place awards in consecutive years in the Excellence in Technology Communications competition

Family
Churbuck and his wife together have three children.

References

External links 
 https://churbuck.com/
 Breakfast with David Churbuck

Living people
American male bloggers
American bloggers
Forbes people
Lenovo people
McKinsey & Company people
21st-century American non-fiction writers
Year of birth missing (living people)